Hazaribagh Wildlife Sanctuary (earlier called Hazaribagh National Park) is a wildlife sanctuary in Jharkhand, India, about  north of Ranchi. It was established in 1955. 

Earlier it was palace 
to tigers, leopards, and many more animals but now rarely animals other than nilgai and hyena are seen. It is known that many foreigners also used to visit the then-called National Park, but due to lack of care by government, it has become mere a forest. Very few tourists can be seen now. Hazaribagh, which was known as a tourist destination, is now losing its title.

History 
The Hazaribagh National Park was established in 1955. It was demoted to the status of a wildlife sanctuary in 1976.

References

External links

Wildlife sanctuaries in Jharkhand
Hazaribagh
Chota Nagpur dry deciduous forests
Protected areas established in 1955
1955 establishments in Bihar